RabbitVCS is a graphical front-end for version control systems available on Linux.  It integrates into file managers to provide file context menu access to version control repositories.  The project was originally called NautilusSvn, but due to the desire to support file managers in addition to Nautilus and more version control systems, it was renamed to RabbitVCS (Version Control System).

The interface was inspired by TortoiseSVN, recognisable by the file manager shell integration, which is available on Nautilus and Thunar in the case of RabbitVCS.  It can also integrate into Gedit or run independently on the command line.

Note however the Thunar integration does not support SVN status marks (otherwise known as "emblems") on file icons.

Git 
As of release 0.14 Beta 1, Git version control is also supported.  Under active development on github https://github.com/rabbitvcs/rabbitvcs.

References

External links 
 

Git (software)
Apache Subversion
Version control GUI tools